ORF7b is a gene found in coronaviruses of the genus Betacoronavirus, which expresses the accessory protein Betacoronavirus NS7b protein. It is a short, highly hydrophobic transmembrane protein of unknown function.

Structure

ORF7b protein is a transmembrane protein with a single transmembrane helix whose membrane topology orients the C-terminus in the cytosol. In SARS-CoV, it is 44 amino acid residues and in SARS-CoV-2 it is 43 residues, with about 85% sequence identity.

Expression and localization
ORF7b is an overlapping gene that overlaps ORF7a. The protein is probably expressed from subgenomic RNA through leaky scanning. In SARS-CoV, it is localized to the Golgi apparatus, which requires the transmembrane helix sequence. In SARS-CoV-2, it has been reported to associate with the endoplasmic reticulum.

Function
The function of the ORF7b protein is not well characterized. It is not essential for viral replication, though there is inconsistent evidence from studies of SARS-CoV on whether its deletion affects replication. In SARS-CoV, it has been identified incorporating into virions, suggesting it is a minor viral structural protein. A SARS-CoV-2 variant with a deletion mutation in the ORF7b region, resulting in a fusion protein between ORF7b and ORF8, has been identified, of unclear significance.

References

Coronavirus proteins